Edward Francis Simms (March 5, 1871 – December 6, 1938) was an American lawyer, oil industrialist, and owner and breeder of Thoroughbred racehorses about whom a Houston Post obituary said his career was "a saga of American accomplishment."

A graduate of Yale University and the University of Virginia School of Law, at the turn of the 20th Century Simms went to Texas where he made a fortune in oil exploration in the Sour Lake area. While at Yale, he was a member of Delta Kappa Epsilon fraternity. In 1915 he returned to Kentucky where he bought out his brother William's share in Xalapa Farm near Paris, Kentucky, a property they had inherited from their father. Edward Simms would become a successful breeder of Thoroughbred racehorses.

Edward Simms died December 6, 1938, at Johns Hopkins Hospital in Baltimore, Maryland where he had been undergoing treatment for leukemia.

References

1871 births
1938 deaths
Deaths from leukemia
Yale University alumni
University of Virginia School of Law alumni
Businesspeople from Kentucky
Businesspeople from Texas
American businesspeople in the oil industry
Texas Oil Boom people
American racehorse owners and breeders
People from Paris, Kentucky
Burials at Glenwood Cemetery (Houston, Texas)